The siege of Chartres was part of the Viking incursions in France. In 911, the Viking Rollo led a siege on the city of Chartres, which had previously been raided and burned by Vikings in 858. The siege resulted in the defeat of the Viking forces. After negotiations with Charles the Simple, Rollo was then granted the Duchy of Normandy in exchange for loyalty to the kingdom of West Francia.

The Viking incursions into Francia began in 820 CE. The raids were frequent and devastating, reaching Paris multiple times. Preceding the battle at Chartres, Vikings, most likely led by Rollo, had been conducting raids into central Francia in 910, and earlier in 876 had seized Rouen, which had established a permanent foothold on the region.

The siege 
Since 858, the city of Chartres had undergone no direct attacks. In the 53 years between the sieges, the city had been fortified with trapezoidal fortifications. Beginning in April of May of 911, Rollo launched a siege of the city, following a campaign of raiding across the north of Francia. The Norsemen attacked the city with the artillery of the time, but did not succeed before the arrival of a French army in July of that year.

The French army was primarily led by Richard, Duke of Burgundy, and Robert I of France, and was composed primarily of Burgundians, Aquitanians, and the French. Richard attacked Rollo and his forces, and they met in battle. According to legend, the bishop brought out the Virgin's Tunic, a holy relic supposedly worn by the Virgin Mary, which blinded the Norsemen and led the French to victory. In reality, the veil may have served as a distraction that enabled the French to gain the upper hand over the Norsemen. The French successfully managed to encircle and capture the majority of the Norse army, but Rollo and a small company escaped.

Because of Rollo's escape, the raids and occupation of Rouen by the Norsemen would continue despite the loss. The French opened negotiations with Rollo to end the violence, which would lead to the Treaty of Saint-Clair-sur-Epte.

In 1618 the Italian painter Padovanino painted a version of the event which now hangs in the Pinacoteca di Brera.

Treaty of Saint-Clair-sur-Epte 

The treaty of Saint-Clair-sur-Epte was agreed on between Rollo and Charles the Simple, who met personally to discuss the terms. Rollo was granted the land around the mouth of the Seine and Rouen. This marked the establishment of the Duchy of Normandy. In exchange for this land, Rollo promised his loyalty to West Francia, religious conversion to Christianity, and a promise to defend the Seine's estuary from other viking raiders.

References

Chartres
Chartres
Chartres
Chartres
History of Eure-et-Loir
911
10th century in France
Chartres
Rollo
Chartres